The Dolmen are an English, Weymouth, Dorset-based, Celtic rock/folk rock band that incorporate elements of Celtic, folk, pagan-themed, and historically based musical works into their largely original repertoire. Current group members are singer and songwriter founder/member Taloch Jameson, guitarist/vocalist/lyricist Josh Elliott, bassist and vocalist Kayleigh Marchant, drummer Chris Jones, and flautist Anja Novotny.

Essential non-musician members of the band are lyric contributor and collaborator, Mark Vine and sound engineer Kirsty Kelly.

The majority of the band's songs and music are composed and produced by multi-instrumentalist Jameson. Guitarist Josh Elliott and bassist Kayleigh Marchant have collaborated with Jameson on the most recent albums, contributing lyrics, musical composition and production assistance.

History
The Dolmen began rather informally in or about 1990, with their first public appearance at The Duke of Albany pub in Weymouth, Dorset, where they debuted as a mainly folk music oriented group.  Since that time, they have become well known on the local and surrounding areas music scene, appearing over the years for repeat performances at many major UK music venues and festivals; among them the  Glastonbury Festival in 1995 and 1997, the Farnham Jazz and Guilford Festivals, The Children of Artemis Witchfest,  and The Pagan Federation festivals.  They have also appeared frequently at Stonehenge in support of The Dolmen Grove, a United Paths Pagan organization based in the South of England.

In 2007, members of The Dolmen were invited special guests at the first New Seven Wonders of the World ceremonies in Lisbon, Portugal, Jameson's original composition having been chosen as the official anthem of that year's "Wonders" contest.

In 2011, the band debuted the continental European leg of their "Storm Tour" with performances at the Elf Fantasy Fair in Haarzuilens, Netherlands.

The Dolmen also appeared over the summer of 2011 at the Keltisch Midzomer Festival, Fantastyval Wouwse Plantage, the Sneek Festival; and in September 2011, at the finale of the Highland Games, in Hank, Netherlands.

Summer 2012 tours for the band included several festival appearances from June through September at the "Mittelalterlich Phantasie Spectaculum" in Germany and also in the Netherlands. 2013 saw the inauguration of the band's "Nuada God of the Sun" tour.

In August 2014 the band performed at Castlefest in Lisse, Netherlands. In October 2014 they performed at the Gothic & Fantasy Fair in Rijswijk, Netherlands and in December 2014 they performed at the Midwinter Fair in the Archeon in Alphen aan den Rijn, Netherlands.

In 2019, The Dolmen were named "Best International Live Band", at the Bastaard Fantasy Awards, where they also won "Best Album Of The Year" for their  2018 album, "Wytches and Cunningfolk".  In addition, The Dolmen were named "Best Pagan Band UK" in the 2018 "Pagan Events UK" competition.

Music

The Dolmen are an independent, self-published group.  Their musical style covers a wide range from traditional Celtic folk music to electric rock, including modern interpretations of historical material and events.

In 2008, the band released "Winter Solstice", a collection of original carols and songs inspired by the ancient pre-Christian themes of the season, drawing heavily upon the pagan traditions and mythology of the British Isles associated with the celebration of Yule.

The Dolmen's early 2010 album, The Crabchurch Conspiracy is a departure in many ways from their general offerings in that it is a musical re-telling of the events of a little-known but decisive battle of the English Civil War taking place in February 1645 at the strategic Dorset seaport of Weymouth.  Based on the book of the same name by author/historian and Dolmen collaborator Mark Vine, the album utilizes both song and spoken word to recount the daring exploits of the Sydenham brothers, William and Francis, who thwarted the Royalist conspirators in their bid to seize the town, culminating in The Battle of Weymouth. Professor Ronald Hutton of the University of Bristol, a leading expert on 17th century Britain, speaks a stirring introduction to the album.

In August 2010, the band released their first double album, "Spirits of the Sea", a collection of original songs, sea chanteys, and atmospheric musical arrangements interspersed with tales and narrations of the historical exploits of several well-known pirates, buccaneers and 'gentlemen of the marque'.  Among the album's Poole, Devon, Dorset and Bristol UK privateers are Blackbeard, Calico Jack, William Lewis, Cap'n Ned Lowe, Henry Strangways, and the sinister husband-and-wife team of Eric Cobham and Maria Lindsey.  The album also celebrates in song and story the infamous Harry Paye of Poole, whose life and adventures are spoken of on the album by a linear descendant, Mr. Bob Paye.  Mr. Paye, a retired educator, lives still within the area from which his famous ancestor sailed forth.  "Paye Day", now a charitable event, is celebrated each Summer in Poole in honor of their famous pirate son.

With the advent of "Spirits of the Sea" and furthered by the energy of their 2012 double album, "Storm", The Dolmen created "The Pirates Keep", a musically oriented gathering that, with the support of several historically influenced re-enactment groups, meet at various venues within the UK to re-create as authentically as possible pirate gatherings of old, during which the band's music is enhanced by audience participation in which true, and sometimes fanciful but thrilling tales of daring seafaring events are related. Encouraged by audience response, The Dolmen are in the process of filming several of these gatherings and are developing ideas for a film based on the exploits of many of the characters that have emerged as the concept of the Pirates Keep continues to grow.

Aside from the band's collective efforts, Taloch has released several solo albums over the years.  Among the most notable is Crow Dance, a largely shamanistic themed journey that explores his ancestral Native American heritage, incorporating also ancient spiritual elements of his Welsh roots.

Album art
Since the release of Taloch Jameson's solo album, Crow Dance, all subsequent album art and overall CD design have been created by Weymouth, Dorset artist and illustrator, Semirani Wolf Vine. Notable for her fluid imagery and utilization of vivid, primary colours, she also collaborates with the band in the production of concert posters and a variety of material for media release.

Discography
1994: Dolmenation
1995: Spirits of the Land
1999: Above & Below
2000: Undefeated
2005: Dolmen Folk
2007: Songs From the Cauldron
2008: Ah Ry Ah
2008: Winter Solstice
2010: Crabchurch Conspiracy, based on a historical work by Mark Vine
2010: Spirits of The Sea
2011: Whispering Winds
2012: Storm
2012: Wytchlord
2014: The Banquet
2014: The Ballad of Cape Clear
2015: Kayleigh
2016: Live at Castlefest
2016: NUADA
2018: Wytches & Cunningfolk
2022: Celtic Giants (Collaboration with the band Connach)

References

External links
 The Dolmen website

English folk rock groups
Celtic rock music
English gothic rock groups
Modern pagan musical groups
Modern paganism in the United Kingdom